Ralph L. Kilzer (born March 30, 1935) is an American politician and physician who served as a member of the North Dakota Senate for the 47th district from 1998 to 2018.

Education 
Kilzer earned a Bachelor of Science degree from Saint John's University, followed by a Doctor of Medicine and Master of Public Health from the Medical College of Wisconsin.

Career 
Kilzer served in the United States Army. He later worked as an orthopedic surgeon and as a clinical professor of surgery at the University of North Dakota School of Medicine and Health Sciences. He was also a medical consultant for the North Dakota Workers Compensation Bureau. From 1996 to 1998, he was a member of the North Dakota House of Representatives. Kilzer was elected to the North Dakota Senate in November 1998 and assumed office on December 1, 1998.

References

Living people
1935 births
Presidents pro tempore of the North Dakota Senate
Republican Party North Dakota state senators
21st-century American politicians